The Venezuela women's national volleyball team is the national team of Venezuela. The dominant forces in women's volleyball on the South American continent are Brazil,  Peru and Argentina. The team's highest achievement was during the 2008 South American Olympic Qualification Tournament, defeating Peru in the finals and becoming the only South American team other than Brazil and Peru to compete at the Olympics.

Team Roster
<noinclude>

Results

Olympic Games
 1964 to 2004 — did not qualify
 2008 — 11th place
Yéssica Paz, Génesis Franchesco, Jayce Andradre,  María Valero, Amarilis Villar, Desiree Glod, Aleoscar Blanco, Shirley Florian, Gheraldine Quijada, María José Pérez, Roslandy Acosta and Wendy Romero. Head coach: Tomas Fernández

World Championship
 1952 to 1994 — did not qualify
 1998 — did not qualify
 2002 — did not qualify
 2006 — did not qualify
 2010 — did not qualify

FIVB World Grand Prix
 2017 — 28th

Pan American Games
 1955 to 1979 – did not participate
 1983 — 7th place
 1987 — did not participate
 1991 — did not participate
 1995 — did not participate
 1999 — did not participate
 2003 — 5th place
 2007 — did not participate
 2011 — did not participate

Pan-American Cup
2002 — did not participate
2003 — 5th place
2004 — did not participate
2005 — 8th place
2006 — 8th place
2007 — did not participate
2008 — 6th place
2009 to 2015 — did not participate
2016 — 8th place
2017 — 10th place

Bolivarian Games
 2005 —  Silver Medal
 2009 —  Silver Medal

South American Championship
 1951 to 1967 — did not participate
 1969 — 4th place
 1971 — did not participate
 1973 — 5th place
 1975 — did not participate
 1977 — 7th place
 1979 — 5th place
 1981 — did not participate
 1983 — 4th place
 1985 —  Bronze Medal
 1987 —  Bronze Medal
 1989 — 4th place
 1991 — 5th place
 1993 —  Bronze Medal
 1995 — 4th place
 1997 — 4th place
 1999 — 4th place
 2001 —  Bronze Medal
 2003 — did not participate
 2005 — 4th place
 2007 —  Bronze Medal
Yessica Paz, Luz Delfines, Génesis Franchesco, María Valero, Amarilis Villar, Jayce Andrade (c), Desiree Glod, Gheraldine Quijada, Shirley Florian, Aleoscar Blanco, Carmen San Miguel, and María José Pérez. Head coach: Tomás Fernández.
 2009 — 6th place
 2011 — did not participate
 2013 — 5th place
 2015 — 5th place
 2017 — 5th place

References
Sports123
Volleyball Almanac
Venezuela at the 2008 Summer Olympics

Volleyball
National women's volleyball teams
Volleyball in Venezuela